In computing with words and perceptions (CWP), the objects of computation are words, perceptions, and propositions drawn from a natural language.  The central theme of CWP is the concept of a generalised constraint.  The meaning of a proposition is expressed as a generalised constraint.

CWP is a necessary tool when the available information is perception-based or not precise enough to use numbers.

See also
Fuzzy set
Lotfi Zadeh
Perceptual computing
Type-2 fuzzy sets and systems

References

 L. A. Zadeh, “Fuzzy logic = computing with words,” IEEE Trans. on Fuzzy Systems, vol. 4, pp. 103-111, 1996.

Soft computing